Nancy Hopkins Tier (May 16, 1909 – January 15, 1997) was an aviator. She was the president of the International Women's Air and Space Museum and a member of United Flying Octogenarians.

Early life
She was born as Nancy Hopkins on May 16, 1909 in Washington, D.C. Her father was Alfred Francis Hopkins I (1879–1955) who was born in Wayne, Pennsylvania and worked as an antique salesman. Alfred was said to be related to the Hopkins family that started Johns Hopkins University; Alfred's father was from Maryland, and his mother from Maine. Nancy's mother was Anne DeWolf Gibson (1877–1963). Nancy had a brother, Alfred Francis Hopkins II (1914–1988), an illustrator, and two sisters, Frances and Betty. She was a niece of Lady Nancy Astor and her uncle, Charles Dana Gibson (1867–1944), was the creator of the Gibson Girl.

Career
In November 1927 she had her first flight from Hoover Field in Arlington, Virginia, and in 1929 she received limited commercial license #5889 at Roosevelt Field in New York. In 1930 she listed her occupation as "aviation air pilot". That same year her father was working as an "antique salesman" and her mother was not listed as living in the household.

In 1930, she entered the Women's Dixie Derby,  2,000 mile air race from Washington, District of Columbia  to Chicago, Illinois. She flew her Viking Kitty Hawk B4 biplane, NC30V. That same year she was one of four women in the 5,000-mile Ford National Reliability Air Tour, and the only woman pilot.

On a ride during the winter of 1931 her plane was in a flat spin and would have crashed. She climbed out of the cockpit preparing to parachute but her weight on the wing tilted the aircraft enough to take her out of the spin. She climbed back into the cockpit and regained control at 200 feet. This got her a job at Viking as a spokeswoman. In 1931 she also received her transport license.

She participated in several air races including:
1930 Ford Reliability Tour
1930 Women's Dixie Derby
1932 Meridien Aviation Pylon Race
1971 New England Air Race

Hopkins joined the Connecticut Civil Air Patrol in 1942 and rose to the rank of Colonel.

Personal life
She married Irving Vanderroest Tier (1902–1978) on February 24, 1931 in Connecticut.

Hopkins died in Sharon, Connecticut on January 15, 1997.

Timeline

1909 Birth
1927 First flight from Hoover Field in Arlington, Virginia
1929 Limited commercial license #5889 at Roosevelt Field, New York
1929 Charter member of Ninety-Nines
1930 Ford National Reliability Air Tour
1930 Women's Dixie Derby
1931 Transport license
1931 Marriage
1931 Plane in a spin
1931 Connecticut Speed Champion
1932 Meridien Aviation Pylon Race
1933 Flew coast to coast
1942 Civil Air Patrol
1963 Flew the first day covers for the Amelia Earhart stamp from Atchison to New York City
1971 New England Air Race
1976 C.W. Post University award
1983 Wings Club award
1986 President of the International Women's Air and Space Museum
1992 Pioneer Women in Aviation Hall of Fame
1992 (circa) Honorary member of US Air Force's 38th Strategic Missile Wing
1994 resigns as president of the International Women's Air and Space Museum
1997 Death

References

Further reading
George Vecsey and George C. Dade; Getting off the Ground
New York Times; August 29, 1930, page 03; "Lindberghs hailed by air race crowd"

External links
Nancy Hopkins at Early Aviators
National Air Tour website

1909 births
1997 deaths
Aviators from Washington, D.C.
People of the Civil Air Patrol
Ford National Reliability Air Tour
American women aviators
20th-century American women